Aluycia Gradenigo (died 1385) was the Dogaressa of Venice by marriage to the Doge Marino Faliero (r. 1354–1355).

Aluycia was the daughter of Nicolo Gradenigo and related to doge Pietro Gradenigo. She was known for her beauty and her love life, and said to have had many affairs. She is known for her affair with Michele Steno, which was the catalyst for a failed coup d'etat by doge Faliero for which he was executed.

References 
 Staley, Edgcumbe:  The dogaressas of Venice : The wives of the doges, London : T. W. Laurie, 1910

1385 deaths
Dogaressas of Venice
Year of birth unknown
14th-century Venetian people
14th-century Venetian women